Football Club Sochi, is a Russian professional football club based in Sochi. The club is playing its home matches at the 47,000-capacity Fisht Stadium.

History
FC Sochi was founded on 6 June 2018 after the relocation of FC Dynamo Saint Petersburg to Sochi, thus becoming the only professional football club in the city.

On 11 May 2019, the club secured a top-two finish in the 2018–19 Russian National Football League and subsequently promotion to the Russian Premier League for the 2019–20 season for the first time in the club's history.

On 20 November 2019, Sochi announced that Aleksandr Tochilin had resigned as manager, with Roman Berezovsky being placed in temporary charge. On 8 December 2019, Sochi announced Vladimir Fedotov as their new permanent manager on a -year contract.

On 19 June 2020, Sochi beat FC Rostov 10–1, making it their biggest Premier League win in their history. Rostov missed their full first and second squad (42 players) due to positive COVID-19 tests in both squads.

Sochi managed to finish in twelfth place in their debut season in the top tier, avoiding relegation.

Sochi finished the 2020–21 Russian Premier League season in 5th place and qualified for European competition (UEFA Europa Conference League) for the first time in their history.

In the 2021–22 Russian Premier League, Sochi finished in 2nd place after beating FC Dynamo Moscow away 5–1 on the last matchday of the season and overtaking Dynamo in the standings.

League position

European history
For their inaugural European campaign, Sochi where drawn against Azerbaijan Cup champions, Keşla, in the UEFA Europa Conference League on 16 June 2021.

Stadiums
Since its creation, PFC Sochi plays at Fisht Olympic Stadium in Sochi. The stadium provides 40,000 seats to its spectators.

The Federal Sport base "Yug Sport" was the training center in the beginning of the 2018–19 season.

Current squad
As of 22 February 2023

Out on loan

Coaching staff
 Manager - Kurban Berdyev
 Assistant managers - Aleksandr Novikov, Roman Berezovsky, Murat Iskakov
 Goalkeeping coach - Dmitri Borodin

Honours
Russian Football National League
 Promoted: 2018–19

Manager history

Ownerships, kit suppliers, and sponsors

Notable players
Had international caps for their respective countries. Players whose name is listed in bold represented their countries while playing for Sochi.

Russia
 Soslan Dzhanayev
 Aleksandr Kokorin
 Aleksandr Kovalenko
 Fyodor Kudryashov
 Artyom Makarchuk
 Yevgeni Makeyev
 Andrei Mostovoy
 Elmir Nabiullin
 Ivan Novoseltsev
 Dmitry Poloz
 Sergei Terekhov
 Artur Yusupov
 Anton Zabolotny
Former USSR countries
 Aleksandre Karapetian
 Erik Vardanyan

Europe
 Ivelin Popov
 Mateo Barać
 Adil Rami
 Luka Đorđević
 Dušan Lagator
 Miha Mevlja

Africa
 Giannelli Imbula
 Victorien Angban
 Moussa Sissako

South America
 Emanuel Mammana
 Christian Noboa

References

External links
 

 
Association football clubs established in 2018
Sport in Sochi
2018 establishments in Russia